John Nelson Brander (born 15 June 1884) was a Scottish footballer who played for Dumbarton, Vale of Leven, Rangers and Clydebank.

References

1884 births
1977 deaths
Sportspeople from Dumbarton
Footballers from West Dunbartonshire
Scottish footballers
Dumbarton F.C. players
Vale of Leven F.C. players
Rangers F.C. players
Clydebank F.C. (1914) players
Scottish Football League players
Date of death missing
Association football forwards